Alicia Elsbeth Stallings (born July 2, 1968) is an American New Formalist and Philhellene poet and translator. A fellow of the American Academy of Arts and Sciences, she was named a 2011 MacArthur Fellow (the "Genius Grant").

Background
Stallings was born and raised in Decatur, Georgia and studied classics at the University of Georgia (A.B., 1990) and the University of Oxford (MSt in Latin Literature, 1991, Lady Margaret Hall).  She is an editor with the Atlanta Review. In 1999, Stallings moved to Athens, Greece and has lived there ever since. She is the Poetry Program Director of the Athens Centre.
She is married to John Psaropoulos, who was the editor of the Athens News.

Stallings's poetry uses traditional forms, and she has been associated with the New Formalism.

She is a frequent contributor of poems and essays to Poetry magazine and the Times Literary Supplement.  Her work has been published in The New Yorker, The Atlantic, The New York Review of Books, The Times Literary Supplement, The Sewanee Review, Beloit Poetry Journal, and many other publications. She has published four books of original verse: Archaic Smile (1999), Hapax (2006), Olives (2012) and Like (2018). In 2007, she published a verse translation of Lucretius's De Rerum Natura (The Nature of Things) and, in 2018, a verse translation of Hesiod's Works and Days, both with Penguin Classics.

Critical response
In nominating Stallings for the position of Oxford Professor of Poetry in 2015, British literary critic and scholar Sir Christopher Ricks wrote: "The poems of A. E. Stallings are never less than the true voice of feeling, and always more ... she is able to realize in her poems the myriad minds of Europe." The MacArthur Fellowship committee praised her "mastery" of poetic form, declaring that: "[t]hrough her technical dexterity and graceful fusion of content and form, Stallings is revealing the timelessness of poetic expression and antiquity's relevance for today."

In a review for her book Archaic Smile, Able Muse, a formalist online poetry journal, noted that, "For all of Stallings' formal virtuosity, few of her poems are strictly metrically regular. Indeed, one of the pleasant surprises of Archaic Smile is the number of superb poems in the gray zone between free and blank verse." Her work has been favorably compared to the poetry of Richard Wilbur and Edna St. Vincent Millay.
In a review of her second book, Hapax, Peter Campion critically wrote that, "The meter and rhyme unfold elegantly, but at the expense of idiom," a criticism that is commonly aimed at the Formalist poets. On a positive note, Campion also states that, "[her best poems in the collection] match prosodic talent with intensely rendered feelings." In a review for her collection Olives, Publishers Weekly stated that they were most impressed with those poems that were not responses to ancient mythology, noting, "When she unleashes her technical gifts upon poems in which she builds a new narrative instead of building upon an old one, Stallings achieves a restrained, stark poise that is threatening even by New Formalism standards."

Awards
Her debut poetry collection, Archaic Smile, was awarded the 1999 Richard Wilbur Award and was a finalist for both the Yale Younger Poets Series and the Walt Whitman Award. Her second collection, Hapax (2006), was awarded the 2008 Poets' Prize. Her poems have appeared in The Best American Poetry anthologies of 1994, 2000, 2015, 2016, and 2017. She has been awarded a Pushcart Prize, the Eunice Tietjens Prize, the 2004 Howard Nemerov Sonnet Award, and the James Dickey Prize.

In 2010, she was awarded the Willis Barnstone Translation Prize.
In 2011, she won a Guggenheim Fellowship, received a MacArthur Foundation Fellowship and was named a Fellow of United States Artists. In 2012, the book Olives was a finalist for the National Book Critics Circle Award. She is a Fellow of the American Academy of Arts & Sciences. In 2019, her book Like was a finalist for the Pulitzer Prize for Poetry.

Books
 
 
  Verse translation of Lucretius's De Rerum Natura. 
 
 
  Verse translation of Hesiod's Works and Days.
 
 'The Battle Between the Frogs and the Mice': A Tiny Homeric Epic. Paul Dry. 2019.  . Verse translation of the Batrachomyomachia.

References

External links

(Archived 2009-10-23)
Athens Centre 2009 Poetry Workshop webpage
Poems by A.E. Stallings and biography at PoetryFoundation.org

American philhellenes
Formalist poets
Pseudonymous women writers
Poets from Georgia (U.S. state)
University of Georgia alumni
Writers from Atlanta
1968 births
Living people
People from Decatur, Georgia
MacArthur Fellows
Fellows of the American Academy of Arts and Sciences
American women poets
Latin–English translators
American expatriates in Greece
20th-century American poets
20th-century American women writers
21st-century American poets
21st-century translators
21st-century American women writers
20th-century pseudonymous writers
21st-century pseudonymous writers
Alumni of Lady Margaret Hall, Oxford